Vache (died 839) was a Prince and Chorepiscopus of Kakheti in eastern Georgia from 827 to 839. He came of the Kvabulidze clan and was installed by the Gardabanian community after the death of his predecessor Grigol. He was succeeded by Samuel.

Bibliography 
Toumanoff, Cyrille (1976, Rome). Manuel de Généalogie et de Chronologie pour le Caucase chrétien (Arménie, Géorgie, Albanie).
Вахушти Багратиони. История царства грузинского. Возникновение и жизнь Кахети и Эрети. Ч.1.

839 deaths
Princes of Kakheti
Year of birth unknown